Khich (also Romanized as Khīch; also known as Khīj) is a village in Rayen Rural District, Rayen District, Kerman County, Kerman Province, Iran. At the 2006 census, its population was 34, in 8 families.

References 

Populated places in Kerman County